The Swilken Burn, or Swilcan Burn, is a  long burn (stream) in Fife, Scotland. It flows into the North Sea to the north of the town of St Andrews on the east coast of Fife.

Course
The source of the burn is in a field to the north-east of the village of Strathkinness, located 3 miles to the west of St Andrews. From there, the burn flows across farmland, then along the A91 road to the north of the North Haugh campus of the University of St Andrews, and finally through the Old Course at St Andrews, where the burn represents a water hazard. The famous Swilcan Bridge spans the burn between the first and eighteenth fairways of the Old Course. Further downstream, the burn's mouth is a southern boundary of West Sand Beach of St Andrews.

Etymology and spelling
The name may derive from a form of Scots word swelch which means ‘whirlpool, abyss in the sea’ and has a common root with the English verb ‘to swallow’.
Since the 18th century, both the burn and the bridge have been spelled in various ways, including Swilcanthe, Swilcauth, Swilkin, Swilken, and Swilcan.  Many modern maps spell the bridge’s name as ‘’Swilcan’’ (this variant is also used by the Royal and Ancient Golf Club), but the burn’s name as ‘’Swilken’’.

History
Approaching the sea and flowing through the golf course, the Swilken Burn used to change its course from time to time, until 1834 when the construction of retaining walls took place, fixing the course of the stream for the first time. In 1879, the course of the burn within the golf course was changed as a result of a dispute between landowners.

At least until the mid-19th century, the Swilken Burn was used by townspeople to wash their clothes The 1842 version of the golf rules adopted by The Royal and Ancient Golf Club of St Andrews stipulated that "When a ball lies on clothes or within a club-length of a washing tub, the clothes may be drawn from under the ball, and the tub may be removed."

References 

Rivers of Fife
St Andrews